Beaver Mountain, formerly known as Squaw Mountain, is a mountain located in Adirondack Mountains in Hamilton County, New York, United States, in the Town of Indian Lake south-southwest of Indian Lake.

References

Mountains of Hamilton County, New York
Mountains of New York (state)